György Kárpáti (23 June 1935 – 17 June 2020)  was a Hungarian water polo player who competed at the 1952 Summer Olympics,  1956 Summer Olympics, 1960 Summer Olympics, and 1964 Summer Olympics. He is one of eight male athletes who won four or more Olympic medals in water polo, and one of ten male athletes who won three Olympic gold medals in water polo.

Career 
Kárpáti was born in Budapest, and was a member of the Hungarian team which won the gold medal in the 1952 tournament. He played five matches and scored four goals.

Four years later he was a member of the Hungarian team which won again the gold medal in the 1956 Olympic tournament. He played six matches and scored at least six goals (not all scorers are known).

At the 1960 Games he won the bronze medal with the Hungarian team. He played four matches and scored five goals.

His last Olympic tournament was in Tokyo 1964 where he won his third gold medal. He played six matches and scored four goals for the Hungarian team.

Kárpáti studied and gained a degree in law, but he never practised it, he also got a degree in coaching in 1964, which he used when he was assistant coach to Dezső Gyarmati for the national team between 1970-80. Their main success was winning the gold medal at the 1976 Summer Olympics.

In 1982, Kárpáti was elected in to the International Swimming Hall of Fame, and from 1994 he became a member of the Association of Immortal Hungarian Athletes.

Death 
After a long illness Kárpáti died on 17 June 2020, aged 84 years. He was buried in the Farkasréti Cemetery on 2 July 2020.

Personal life 
György was born Jewish. He was a great friend of the former water polo player and distinguished Italian actor Bud Spencer.

See also
 Hungary men's Olympic water polo team records and statistics
 List of multiple Olympic medalists in one event
 List of multiple Olympic gold medalists in one event
 List of Olympic champions in men's water polo
 List of Olympic medalists in water polo (men)
 List of players who have appeared in multiple men's Olympic water polo tournaments
 List of members of the International Swimming Hall of Fame
 List of select Jewish water polo players
 Blood in the Water match

References

External links
 

1935 births
2020 deaths
Water polo players from Budapest
Hungarian male water polo players
Olympic water polo players of Hungary
Water polo players at the 1952 Summer Olympics
Water polo players at the 1956 Summer Olympics
Water polo players at the 1960 Summer Olympics
Water polo players at the 1964 Summer Olympics
Olympic gold medalists for Hungary
Olympic bronze medalists for Hungary
Olympic medalists in water polo
Hungarian Jews
Jewish water polo players
Medalists at the 1964 Summer Olympics
Medalists at the 1960 Summer Olympics
Medalists at the 1956 Summer Olympics
Medalists at the 1952 Summer Olympics
Hungarian water polo coaches
Burials at Farkasréti Cemetery